"Do It Again" is a song by Norwegian electronic music duo Röyksopp and Swedish singer Robyn from their extended play of the same name (2014). It was released digitally on 28 April 2014 as the EP's lead single. A remix bundle was released exclusively on Beatport on 26 May 2014. The music video, directed by Martin de Thurah, was filmed over three days in four Mexican states—Mexico City, Veracruz, Puebla and Hidalgo—and premiered on 21 July 2014.

The song ranks as Robyn's seventh biggest track, with 3.45 million audio streams and 48,000 downloads in the United Kingdom.

Track listing
Beatport digital download
"Do It Again" (Deniz Koyu Remix) – 5:46
"Do It Again" (Moullinex Remix) – 6:36
"Do It Again" (Moullinex Dub) – 6:37
"Do It Again" (Moby Basement Mix) – 7:35
"Do It Again" (Röyksopp & Robyn vs. Moby Mix) – 6:56
"Do It Again" (Issac Christopher Remix) – 5:55
"Do It Again" (Patrick Pache Remix) – 5:38

Charts

Weekly charts

Year-end charts

See also
 List of number-one dance singles of 2014 (U.S.)

References

2014 singles
2014 songs
Cooking Vinyl singles
Robyn songs
Röyksopp songs
Songs written by Robyn
Songs written by Svein Berge
Songs written by Torbjørn Brundtland
Wall of Sound (record label) singles